The .22 Winchester Rimfire (commonly called the .22 WRF) is an American rimfire rifle cartridge.

History
Introduced in the Winchester M1890 slide rifle, it had a flat-nose slug, and is identical to the .22 Remington Special (which differed only in having a roundnosed slug). It uses a flat-based, inside-lubricated bullet, which differs from the outside-lube heeled bullet of the .22 Short, Long, Long Rifle, and Extra Long rounds.

When introduced, the .22 WRF "was the first notable improvement in the killing power" over the .22 LR, and was able to kill cleaner at up to 75 yd (70 m). It is somewhat less accurate than the .22 LR and is most suited to hunting small game such as rabbits or prairie dogs.

Shortly before World War II, propellants were developed that greatly increased the effectiveness of the .22 LR. These new "High Velocity" loadings offered a nearly 300fps increase in velocity over the original 1050fps .22 LR load. This increase in power of the smaller round, coupled with its cheaper price and sheer number of rifles already owned in .22 LR, effectively killed the .22 WRF.

A variety of Winchester, Remington, and Stevens single-shot and repeater rifles were offered from 1890 onward, but new rifles are not made for this cartridge. .22 WRF ammunition is periodically offered by commercial makers for use in the old guns. It can be fired in any rifle chambered for the more powerful .22 WMR. The shorter WRF cartridge may be limited to single shot use in WMR rifles, since it may not feed from WMR-length magazines, depending on design.

Dimensions
Cartridge dimensions as specified by ANSI/SAAMI.

See also
 List of cartridges by caliber
 List of rifle cartridges
 List of rimfire cartridges
 5 mm caliber

References

Notes
 Barnes, Frank C., ed. by John T. Amber. ".22 Winchester Rimfire", in Cartridges of the World, pp. 275 & 282-3. Northfield, IL: DBI Books, 1972. .

External links

Pistol and rifle cartridges
Rimfire cartridges
Winchester Repeating Arms Company cartridges
Weapons and ammunition introduced in 1890